WOJL (105.5 FM) is a classic hits formatted broadcast radio station licensed to Louisa, Virginia, serving Orange and Louisa counties.  WOJL is owned and operated by Piedmont Communications, Inc.

The format is simulcast on WCVA 1490 kHz and W237CA 95.3 MHz.

History
WOJL signed on the air on July 8, 1980 with the callsign WLSA, carrying a Country format.

At midnight on May 27, 2004, WLSA dropped "105 Country" after being bought by Piedmont Communications and switched to oldies as "Oldies 105". A month later on June 28, the callsign was switched to WOJL, which is now broadcast in HD.

At noon on July 2, 2005, the format was switched again, this time to Adult Hits under the branding "Sam FM".  On August 31, 2015, Westwood One eliminated the Sam FM service.  The same day, WOJL dropped the Adult Hits format, switching to Classic Hits as "Classic Hits 105.5".  The station reverted to the "Sam FM" branding in early January 2016. Also in early 2016, the station began simulcasting on 95.3 W237CA, an FM translator in Culpeper, via sister station 1490 WCVA.

References

External links
105.5 Sam Fm Online

OJL
Classic hits radio stations in the United States
Louisa, Virginia
Radio stations established in 1980